Pothan is a St Thomas Christian name that is the English equivalent to Paul. It may refer to

Pothan Joseph (1892–1972), Indian journalist 
Dileesh Pothan, Indian film director and actor 
Pratap K. Pothen, Indian actor, director, writer, and producer
Pothan Vava, a 2006 Malayalam film